Jagadguru Rambhadracharya (or Swami Rambhadracharya) is a Hindu religious leader, Sanskrit scholar and Katha artist based in Chitrakoot, India. His works consist of poems, commentaries, plays and musical compositions of his works, etc. He has authored more than 100 books and 50 papers, including four epic poems (two each in Sanskrit and Hindi), a Hindi commentary on Tulsidas' Ramcharitmanas, and Sanskrit commentaries on the Ashtadhyayi and the Prasthanatrayi scriptures. Various audio and video recordings o his works have also been released. He writes in Sanskrit, Hindi, Awadhi, Maithili, and several other languages.

Śrībhārgavarāghavīyam is his most notable work, for which he won several awards including the Sahitya Akademi Award for Sanskrit. He has also been given many other literary honors and titles, such as Mahakavi (Great poet) and Kavikularatna (Jewel of the poet clan).

His major literary and musical compositions, grouped by genre, are listed below.

Key

Poetry

Mahākāvyas (Epic poems)

Khaṇḍakāvyas (minor poems)

Gītakāvyas (lyrical poems)

Śatakakāvyas (Poems of one hundred verses)

Stotrakāvyas (Eulogies)

Other poems

Plays

Prose

Sanskrit commentaries on the Prasthānatrayī

Rambhadracharya composed Sanskrit commentaries titled Śrīrāghavakṛpābhāṣyam on the Prasthanatrayi – Brahma Sutra, the Bhagavad Gita, and eleven Upanishads. These commentaries were released on 10 April 1998 by the then Prime Minister of India, Atal Behari Vajpayee. Rambhadracharya composed Śrīrāghavakṛpābhāṣyam on Narada Bhakti Sutra in 1991. He thus revived—after five hundred years—the tradition of Sanskrit commentaries on the Prasthanatrayi. He also gave the Ramananda Sampradaya its second commentary on Prasthanatrayi in Sanskrit, the first being the Ānandabhāṣyam, composed by Ramananda himself. Rambhadracharya's commentary in Sanskrit on the Prasthanatrayi was the first written in almost 600 years.

Other Sanskrit commentaries

Hindi commentaries

Critiques

Discourses

Critical edition of Ramcharitmanas

Rambhadracharya's most controversial work was the critical edition of the Ramcharitmanas, which was published as the Tulsi Peeth edition. He was accused of tampering with the epic, but the dispute died down after Rambhadracharya expressed his regret for any annoyance or pain caused by the publication. A writ petition was also filed against him but it was dismissed. This edition was published in 2005 by Shri Tulsi Peeth Seva Nyas.

Audio and video

See also
Adi Shankara bibliography
Works of Madhvacharya

References

Notes

Works cited

External links

 Official website of Jagadguru Rambhadracharya
 

Bibliographies by writer
Bibliographies of Indian writers